Voodoo Computers Inc. or VoodooPC was a luxury personal computer brand and company. Voodoo was originally started as a niche PC maker in Calgary, Alberta, Canada. It was founded in 1991, and acquired by Hewlett-Packard in 2006. Voodoo specialized in high desktop performance computing. By 2013 the Voodoo name was no longer used, and was replaced by the brand name Omen, which used the same logo until 2020.

Desktop offering
Voodoo PC was most well known for its desktops. They experimented with liquid cooling partnering with CoolIT Systems at one point.  On June 10, 2008, the computer's complete redesign was revealed, showing a new brushed metal case and mounted 7" auxiliary screen.

History 
The company was founded in 1991 by Rahul Sood, and in 1999 Ravi Sood (brother to Rahul) joined the board of operations.  Prior to the acquisition Voodoo employed roughly 40 people between their Canadian headquarters and their web development office in Bangalore.

Acquisition by HP 
On September 28, 2006, Rahul Sood announced on his blog that HP would be acquiring VoodooPC for an undisclosed amount. Rahul Sood will be assuming the position of Chief Technology Officer for HP's Global Voodoo Business Unit.

In August 2007, HP announced the HP Blackbird 002 gaming PC with the label VoodooDNA inside the case, and was released on September 15, 2007.

New direction
Since the acquisition of Voodoo in 2006, the business has been re-developing the brand of Voodoo. This was culminated on the 10th June 2008 with the revelation that Voodoo will focus on high-end, top spec computers rather than gaming machines. Voodoo will also continue with Voodoo DNA machines with HP.

For the launch of their new brand direction they used the tag line of 'Blending Art, Innovation and Performance;' confirming the businesses future as a HP brand.

In 2009, HP used the Envy line as a high-performance computer without the Voodoo branding or Voodoo DNA.

In 2014, HP relaunch the Omen brand and used the Voodoo Tribal mask logo as the official logo until May 2020.

Products

Discontinued
Rage (gaming desktop)
Aria (media center)
Hexx (gaming desktop, small form factor)
Vibe (media center/Xbox combination)
Eden (fanless/silent gaming desktop)
Omega (canceled)
HP Blackbird 002 (high end gaming desktop with VoodooDNA)
HP Firebird (lower end compact gaming desktop with VoodooDNA)
HP Firefly (dual screen laptop/cancelled)
Envy 133 (premium ultraportable notebook) with Splashtop instant-on OS.
F Class
Fury
EGAD
DOLL
Idol
Epic

See also
 HP Omen
 Maingear (VoodooPC url redirect)
 List of computer system manufacturers
 Hewlett-Packard
 Alienware

References

External links
Rahul Sood's Weblog

Voodoo PC
Hewlett-Packard acquisitions
Computer companies established in 1991
1991 establishments in Alberta
Gaming computers
Defunct computer hardware companies
2006 mergers and acquisitions
Computer companies disestablished in 2006
2006 disestablishments in Alberta